6-carboxytetrahydropterin synthase (CPH4 synthase, queD (gene), ToyB , ykvK (gene)) is an enzyme with systematic name 7,8-dihydroneopterin 3'-triphosphate acetaldehyde-lyase (6-carboxy-5,6,7,8-tetrahydropterin and triphosphate-forming). This enzyme catalyses the following reversible chemical reaction.
 7,8-dihydroneopterin 3′-triphosphate + H2O  6-carboxy-5,6,7,8-tetrahydropterin + acetaldehyde + triphosphate

This enzyme binds Zn2+. It is isolated from the bacteria Bacillus subtilis and Escherichia coli. The stimulation is part of the biosynthesis pathway of queuosine. The enzyme from Escherichia coli can also convert 6-pyruvoyl-5,6,7,8-tetrahydropterin and sepiapterin to 6-carboxy-5,6,7,8-tetrahydropterin.

References

External links

EC 4.1.2